Laurel Lunt Prussing (born February 21, 1941) is a Democratic politician who has served as a member of the Illinois House of Representatives, the Mayor of Urbana, Illinois, and County Treasurer of Champaign County, Illinois.

Early career
After earning degrees from Wellesley College and Boston University Lunt-Prussing worked as a research economist at the University of Illinois at Urbana–Champaign
In 1972, she was elected to the Champaign County Board and in 1976 she was elected Champaign County Auditor. While Auditor, Prussing served as president of the Illinois Association of County Auditors and a member of two of the Illinois Comptroller's committees; the local government audit advisory committee and the committee on accounting, auditing and financial reporting. She is married to John Prussing and has three children. She is the author of "Downstate County Government," and advocated for Champaign County to adopt the position of county executive as per the Illinois County Executive Act of 1970.

Illinois House of Representatives
In the 1990 redistricting, the 103rd district’s longtime incumbent, Helen F. Satterthwaite was drawn into a more conservative district that removed the University of Illinois' campus and replaced it with rural, staunchly Republican territory in Champaign, Ford, and Douglas counties. Prussing chose to run in the new 103rd district which now consisted of northeastern Champaign County and southern Ford County. Lunt was narrowly elected, defeating Republican candidate Gregory Cozad, an attorney and financial planner. A Republican target in 1994, she was defeated by Champaign County board member Rick Winkel in an election that saw a record number of Republicans elected.

Interim
In 1996 and 1998, Lunt Prussing ran for Congress in Illinois's 15th congressional district against Tom Ewing. She ran again in 2000, but lost to college professor Mike Kelleher. Kelleher went on to lose to State Representative Tim Johnson. In 2000, she endorsed the presidential campaign of Ralph Nader. In 2002, she lost the Democratic primary for the 103rd district, which now only included Champaign and Urbana, to former Champaign County Recorder of Deeds Naomi Jakobsson.

Mayor of Urbana
In 2004, Prussing announced her candidacy for the Democratic nomination for Mayor of Urbana against three term incumbent Tod Satterthwaite, the son of Helen F. Satterthwaite, her predecessor in the state house. She won the municipal primary and ran unopposed in the 2005 municipal election. She served as the first female mayor of Urbana. She was re-elected in 2009 and 2013. She was defeated in the 2017 primary by Alderwoman Diane Wolfe Marlin.

While Mayor of Urbana, Prussing served as a member of the Illinois P-20 Council and the Law Enforcement Training and Standards Board.

Champaign County Treasurer
Lunt Prussing was elected County Treasurer of Champaign County in the 2018 general election. She resigned from the office effective January 31, 2020.

References

External links
 Official Biography from the City of Urbana
 Official Twitter Account

1941 births
Living people
People from Urbana, Illinois
Politicians from New York City
Wellesley College alumni
Boston University alumni
University of Illinois Urbana-Champaign alumni
Democratic Party members of the Illinois House of Representatives
Women state legislators in Illinois
Mayors of places in Illinois
County board members in Illinois
20th-century American politicians
21st-century American politicians
21st-century American women politicians
20th-century American women politicians
Women mayors of places in Illinois